La Libertad Department, El Salvador
La Libertad Department now La Libertad Region
La Libertad Department, North Peru, one of four departments of North Peru